Hawtry is a surname. Notable people with the surname include:

Charles Hawtrey (disambiguation), multiple people
Mary Hawtry ( 1598–1661), English royalist

See also
Hawtrey